The Last Dream is a collection of fantasy and science fiction stories by American writer Gordon R. Dickson.  It was first published by Baen Books in 1986.  Most of the stories originally appeared in the magazines Fantasy and Science Fiction, Analog Science Fiction and Fact, Fantastic, Startling Stories and Worlds of Fantasy.

Contents

 Introduction, by Sandra Miesel
 "St. Dragon and the George"
 "The Present State of Igneos Research"
 "Ye Prentice and Ye Dragon"
 "A Case History"
 "The Girl Who Played Wolf"
 "Salmanazar"
 "With Butter and Mustard"
 "The Amulet"
 "The Haunted Village"
 "The Three"
 "Walker Between the Planes"
 "The Last Dream"

References

1986 short story collections
Short story collections by Gordon R. Dickson
Fantasy short story collections